The World Association of Investment Promotion Agencies (WAIPA) is an international Non-governmental organization established in 1995 by the United Nations Conference on Trade and Development that acts as a forum for investment promotion agencies (IPA), provides networking and promotes best practice in investment promotion.

The objectives of WAIPA, as reflected in the Association’s Statutes, are to:
 Promote and develop understanding and cooperation amongst IPAs;
 Strengthen information gathering systems, promote the efficient use of information and facilitate access to data sources;
 Share country and regional experiences in attracting foreign investment and enhancing outward investments;
 Assist IPAs to advocate the promotion of policies, within their government, which are beneficial to increasing foreign direct investment and promoting economic development;
Facilitate access to technical assistance and promote training of IPAs.
 
The Secretariat has been based in Geneva, Switzerland since 1995. Since 2015 its headquarters are established in Istanbul, Turkey, from where Waipa serves its 170+ members in 130 countries.

See also
Investment promotion agency

References

External links

Organizations established in 1995
Organisations based in Geneva